Hampton Theophile Lemoine (March 30, 1882 – January 24, 1916) was a college football player and physician.

Sewanee
He transferred from Louisiana State University to Sewanee:The University of the South in Sewanee, Tennessee. Lemoine was a prominent guard on the Sewanee Tigers football team, selected All-Southern in 1902.

Physician
Lemoine was a physician; once a member of the Avoyelles Parish Medical Society. In 1906, he moved from Big Cane to Cottonport. He ran Lemoine Pharmacy by 1911.

References

External links

1882 births
1916 deaths
People from Avoyelles Parish, Louisiana
19th-century players of American football
LSU Tigers football players
Sewanee Tigers football players
Players of American football from Louisiana
American football guards
All-Southern college football players
Physicians from Louisiana